Angus Macdonald Ewing Carmichael (12 June 1925 – 21 March 2013) was a Scottish footballer who played as a left back.

Early and personal life
Angus Macdonald Ewing Carmichael was born on 12 June 1925.

Career
Carmichael represented Great Britain at the 1948 Summer Olympics, making one appearance in the tournament. Carmichael, described as a "tall, brawny left-back", was studying for a degree in veterinary medicine at the time, alongside his football career.

Carmichael played club football for Queen's Park, making 42 appearances in the Scottish Football League.

Later life and death
After graduating from University, and with his football career over due to injury, Carmichael moved to Horncastle, Lincolnshire in order to become a vet. He died on 21 March 2013, at the age of 87.

References

1925 births
2013 deaths
Scottish footballers
Queen's Park F.C. players
Scottish Football League players
Footballers at the 1948 Summer Olympics
Olympic footballers of Great Britain
Association football fullbacks
Scottish veterinarians
People from Mansa District, Zambia